The following is a partial list of Recorded Texas Historic Landmarks (RTHLs) arranged by county as designated by the Texas Historical Commission and local county historical commissions in Texas. This page includes RTHLs in these counties: Cameron, Camp, Carson, Cass, Castro, Chambers, Cherokee, Childress, Clay, Cochran, Coke, Coleman, Collin, Collingsworth, Colorado, Comal, Comanche, Concho, Cooke, Coryell, Cottle, Crane, Crockett, Crosby, Culberson, Dallam, Dallas, Dawson, DeWitt, Deaf Smith, Delta, Denton, Dickens, Dimmit, Donley, and Duval.

KEY

Landmarks with multiple historic designations are colored according to their highest designation within the following hierarchy.

Cameron County

Camp County

Carson County

Cass County

Castro County

Chambers County

Cherokee County

Childress County

Clay County

Cochran County

Coke County

Coleman County

Collin County

Collingsworth County
There are currently no Recorded Texas Historic Landmarks listed within the county.

Colorado County

Comal County

Comanche County

Concho County

Cooke County

Coryell County

Cottle County

Crane County

Crockett County

Crosby County

Culberson County

Dallam County

Dallas County

Dawson County

Deaf Smith County

Delta County

Denton County

DeWitt County

Dickens County

Dimmit County

Donley County

Duval County

See also

References

External links

 (Cameron-Duval)
Landmarks (Cameron-Duval)
Texas geography-related lists